The University of Virginia's College at Wise (UVA Wise) is a public liberal arts college in Wise, Virginia. It is part of the University of Virginia and was established in 1954 as Clinch Valley College of the University of Virginia.

The United States Census Bureau treated the University's campus as a census-designated place for the 2020 US census  and it had a population of 439.

History
The college was first conceived by local residents who petitioned the University of Virginia to establish a college in Wise. As support for a college grew, the Commonwealth of Virginia appropriated $5,000 to open, staff, and operate the college as a two-year junior college on a trial basis for a year; and if successful, another $5,000 would be available for a second year. In the winter of 1954, the local community matched the commonwealth's funds and collected over $6,000 to furnish the classrooms and use for supplies. Clinch Valley College of the University of Virginia opened in September 1954 with an enrollment of 100 freshmen. Clinch Valley College became the westernmost state-supported college in Virginia. Prior to its opening, Virginia lacked public colleges west of Radford.

Clinch Valley College operated as a junior college throughout the late 1950s and 1960s. During that time, the college gained more  support from graduates who wanted to complete their baccalaureate degrees at the same institution and the college began the process to become a four-year college. In June 1970, Clinch Valley College granted its  first Bachelor of Arts degrees; followed by Bachelor of Science degrees, first awarded in 1973. The college continued to grow and added new programs such as nursing and technology and in 1996, the college granted its first Bachelor of Science in Nursing degrees. In 1999, the Virginia General Assembly renamed the school "The University of Virginia's College at Wise," following an unsuccessful effort to change the institution's name in 1991. UVA Wise expanded its focus on international education and signed three sister institution agreements along with initiating cooperative and mutual exchange programs for students and faculty with three international institutions in the late 1990s. In 1998, the college signed a sister institution agreement with Istanbul University. A year later, it signed a second agreement with another Turkish university, Dumlupinar University in Kütahya. In December 2000, the University of Seville in Spain became the college's third sister institution.

Through the early 21st century, UVA Wise underwent rapid growth, with several new buildings and campus beautification projects to accommodate enrollment growth. As of September 2010, the college offered 31 majors, 31 minors and 23 teaching specialties and had an enrollment of about 2,005 students. On February 2, 2012, UVA Wise saw the unexpected death of Chancellor David J. Prior. During his seven years as chancellor, the college experienced dramatic growth in student enrollment and facilities. During his tenure, the UVA Wise's five-year fund raising campaign, known as the "Fulfilling the Dream" campaign, exceeded its goal to raise $50 million. UVA Wise constructed numerous building during Prior's tenure, including the Hunter J. Smith Dining Commons, the Gilliam Center for the Arts and two residence halls, the $30 million Convocation Center, as well as the renovation of the Leonard W. Sandridge Science Center.

Campus

The University of Virginia's College at Wise comprises  in the small town of Wise, Virginia.

Convocation Center
State lawmakers and regional leaders joined The University of Virginia's College at Wise on July 1, 2009, to break ground for a $30 million Convocation Center, the largest single capital project in the college's history at that time. The facility seats 3,000 for sporting events and 4,000 for concerts or convocation activities. The facility provides the region with its first venue to seat large crowds, something economic developers have said is needed to boost growth and development in far Southwest Virginia. Shortly after the death of Chancellor David J. Prior in February 2012, the facilities were dedicated in his honor and named the David J. Prior Convocation Center.

Academics

Accreditations
UVA Wise is accredited by the Southern Association of Colleges and Schools Commission on Colleges (SACSCOC) to award baccalaureate degrees. In addition, the college's computer science and software engineering degree programs are accredited by the Accreditation Board for Engineering and Technology (ABET), the nursing program is accredited by the Commission on Collegiate Nursing Education (CCNE), the teacher education program is accredited by the Teacher Education Accreditation Council (TEAC), and the chemistry program is accredited by the American Chemical Society (ACS).

Departments
UVA Wise has ten departments:

 Department of Business & Economics
 Department of Communications
 Department of Education
 Department of History & Philosophy
 Department of Language and Literature
 Department of Mathematics and Computer Science
 Department of Natural Sciences
 Department of Nursing
 Department of Social Sciences
 Department of Visual and Performing Arts

The college requires all freshmen to enroll in a one-semester seminar that covers adjusting to the demands of college academic work. The seminar used to cover two semesters, until it was modified in the 2012-13 fall semester. Before the modified seminar, the student's seminar instructor became his or her advisor until the student selected a major. Presently, if the student is unsure of the major that he or she wants to be in, the Advising Office becomes the student's adviser. The college also has a 53 semester-hour general education requirement. Students must attend four cultural activities in each their freshman and junior years. The college offers baccalaureate degrees in 31 majors. A College Major is also offered.

Student life

Greek life
There are five Greek life fraternities and sororities.

Fraternities

Alpha Gamma Omega
Kappa Sigma
Pi Kappa Phi
Phi Mu Alpha Sinfonia

Sororities

Sigma Alpha Omega

Student publications
The Highland Cavalier is the student-run newspaper. The college also has a biannual literary journal, Jimson Weed.

Athletics

The Virginia–Wise (UVA Wise) athletic teams are called the Cavaliers (formerly known as the "Highland Cavaliers" before 2017), The college is a member of the NCAA Division II ranks, primarily competing in the South Atlantic Conference (SAC) since the 2019–20 academic year. The Cavaliers previously competed in the D-II Mountain East Conference (MEC) from 2013–14 to 2018–19.

Prior joining the NCAA, UVA Wise previously competed in the Mid-South Conference (MSC) of the National Association of Intercollegiate Athletics (NAIA) from 2010–11 to 2012–13 (with a partial provisional membership as a core member of the D-II Great Midwest Athletic Conference (G-MAC) during their D-II transition within the 2012–13 school year); in the Appalachian Athletic Conference (AAC) from 2001–02 to 2009–10; the Tennessee Valley Athletic Conference from 1994–95 to 2000–01; and in the Kentucky Intercollegiate Athletic Conference (KIAC; now currently known as the River States Conference (RSC) since the 2016–17 school year) from 1971–72 to 1993–94.

UVA Wise competes in 13 intercollegiate varsity sports: Men's sports include baseball, basketball, cross country, football, golf and tennis; while women's sports include basketball, cross country, golf, lacrosse, softball, tennis and volleyball.

Accomplishments
Since moving to NCAA Division II in 2013, the school has claimed conference titles in softball and men's golf and most recently in 2018 their women’s lacrosse program went undefeated in the regular season and finished with a conference championship in their former home of the Mountain East Conference.

CAV-TV
The college broadcasts student news on channel 55, a public access cable station, under the call sign CAV-TV.

Notable alumni
 Hakeem Abdul-Saboor, Olympic bobsledder
 Jerry Kilgore, politician. During 1987 and 1988, Kilgore served as an Assistant United States Attorney for the Western District of Virginia. He was Secretary of Public Safety under Governor George Allen from 1994 to 1998 and was elected Attorney General of Virginia in 2001 by a wide margin.
 Terry Kilgore, politician, elected to the Virginia House of Delegates in 1993; graduated from Clinch Valley College (now UVA Wise).
 Randy Hippeard, professional football player (quarterback).
 Steven Williams, YouTube personality known under the handle Boogie2988.

References

External links
 
 Official athletics website

 
Wise, Virginia
Education in Wise County, Virginia
University of Virginia schools
Universities and colleges accredited by the Southern Association of Colleges and Schools
Buildings and structures in Wise County, Virginia
Tourist attractions in Wise County, Virginia
1954 establishments in Virginia
Educational institutions established in 1954
Public liberal arts colleges in the United States